Bantwal Ramakrishna "Bob" Rau (1951 – December 10, 2002) was a computer engineer and HP Fellow. Rau was a founder and chief architect of Cydrome, where he helped develop the Very long instruction word technology that is now common in modern computer processors. Rau was the recipient of the 2002 Eckert–Mauchly Award.

IEEE Computer Society has established a "B. Ramakrishna Rau Award" in his memory. Past recipients include major contributors in the microarchitecture field.

References

External links
 IEEE Biography of Rau 
 Hewlett Packard obituary
 http://compilers.iecc.com/comparch/article/02-12-128

1951 births
2002 deaths
Computer hardware engineers
Hewlett-Packard people